Lymphedema praecox is a condition characterized by swelling of the soft tissues in which an excessive amount of lymph has accumulated, and generally develops in females between the ages of nine and twenty-five. This is the most common form of primary lymphedema, accounting for about 80% of the patients.

See also 
 Lymphedema
 Lymphedema-distichiasis syndrome
 Aagenaes syndrome
 List of cutaneous conditions

References

External links 

Vascular-related cutaneous conditions